Jonathan Haskel  (born 13 August 1963) is a British economist, and professor of economics at Imperial College Business School.

Haskel currently serves as board member of the UK Statistics Authority, a member of the Bank of England's Monetary Policy Committee and a member of the Financial Conduct Authority Competition Decisions Committee and the Payment System Regulator Enforcement and Competition Decisions Committee.

Early life
Haskel is the son of Simon Haskel and the grandson of Isaac Haskel. He was educated at King's College School. He studied Economics at the University of Bristol (BSc) and at the London School of Economics (MSc and PhD), with his PhD under the supervision of Christopher Pissarides.

Academic career
Prior to joining Imperial College London, Haskel was a professor and head of the economics department at Queen Mary University of London.

Haskel has taught at the University of Bristol and London Business School and been a visiting professor at the Tuck School of Business, Dartmouth College, US; Stern School of Business, New York University, US; and visiting researcher at the Australian National University.

Haskel is a professor of economics at Imperial College Business School, specialising in innovation and productivity.

Other roles
In February 2016 he was appointed as a non-executive director of the UK Statistics Authority.

In September 2015, Haskel has been appointed as a member of the Financial Conduct Authority Competition Decisions Committee and the Payment System Regulator Enforcement and Competition Decisions Committee.

In May 2018, it was announced that Haskel would become a member of the Bank of England's Monetary Policy Committee (MPC), replacing Ian McCafferty from 1 September. There were four women on the five-person shortlist. He was appointed Commander of the Order of the British Empire in the 2018 Birthday Honours.

Publications
Capitalism Without Capital: The Rise of the Intangible Economy (co-author, Stian Westlake)

Personal life
He is married to the artist Sue Haskel, and they have two daughters.

References

External links
 https://www.imperial.ac.uk/people/j.haskel   personal page at Imperial College Business School
 https://ideas.repec.org/e/pha161.html RePEc   research papers

Living people
Monetary Policy Committee members
British economists
Academics of Imperial College London
Academics of Queen Mary University of London
1963 births
People educated at King's College School, London
Alumni of the University of Bristol
Alumni of the London School of Economics